The Dolly Teen Choice Awards began in 2006 as a non-broadcast show with hosts Stephanie McIntosh and Jules Lund. The show (presented by Dolly Magazine and sponsored by Target) was held at Sydney's Luna Park Big Top on 31 August 2006 and included guests The Veronicas, Anthony Callea, Guy Sebastian, Lee Harding, Rogue Traders, Girlband, and Kid Courageous. 
In 2007 The Dolly Teen Choice Awards were held on the 5 September 2007 and hosted by Jules Lund and Jackie O.

Awards location and host(s)
 31 August 2006 - Luna Park Sydney hosted by Stephanie McIntosh and Jules Lund
 5 September 2007 - Luna Park Sydney hosted by Jackie O and Jules Lund
 2008 - Luna Park Sydney hosted by Brian McFadden

Winners 2006
Raddest radio personality: Lowie
Coolest VJ in the country: Axle Whitehead
Most popular TV show: Neighbours
Hottest music act: The Veronicas
Best five-minute feed: Boost Juice
Best mobile phone ring tone: Pussycat Dolls
Most popular sportstar: Ian Thorpe
Hottest album of 2006: Anthony Callea
Best dressed celeb: Jodi Gordon
Cult product of 2006: Maybelline Great Lash Mascara
Best slashie: Natalie Bassingthwaighte
King and Queen of teen: Isabel Lucas and Chris Hemsworth

Winners 2007

Raddest Radio Host/Team: Kyle and Jackie O
Coolest VJ in the Country: James Mathison
Most Popular Show on TV: Home and Away
Hottest Music Act: Dean Geyer
Best Music Video: "Candyman" - Christina Aguilera
Most Downloaded Ringtone in the Country: "Addicted to You" - Anthony Callea
Most Popular Sports Star: Libby Lenton
Most Popular Album: Closer To The Sun - Guy Sebastian
Best Dressed Celeb: Kate Richie
Best Slashie: Jennifer Hawkins
Most Popular Reality TV Show: Dancing with the Stars
Model "Celebrity" Citizen Award (Charity Work): Rhys Wakefield - The Mirabel Foundation
King and Queen of Teen: Dan O'Connor and Natalie Blair

Winners 2008

New Cool Kid On the Block: Gabriella Cilmi
I Wanna Raid Her Wardrobe: Jennifer Hawkins
Best on the Box: Video Hits host Faustina "Fuzzy" Agolley
Totally Talented Actress: Kate Ritchie
Totally Talented Actor: Rhys Wakefield
Glued to the Screen: So You Think You Can Dance Australia
Extreme Inspiration: Guy Sebastian - World Vision
Most played on my iPod: Hook Me Up - The Veronicas
Hottest Homegrown Music: Sneaky Sound System
Global Music Superstar: Rihanna
OMG! Award (for the scandal we can't stop talking about): The Chaser's APEC stunt
Queen of Teen: Indiana Evans
King of Teen: Lincoln Lewis

See also
Dolly (magazine)

References

External links
Dolly Magazine Official Website
Dolly Teen Choice Awards Site
Hot30 Countdown's Dolly Teen Choice Awards coverage

Australian music awards
Awards established in 2006
Awards disestablished in 2008